The Glenn Davis Award is given annually since 1987 by the Los Angeles Times to the best high school football player in the Los Angeles area. It is named after Glenn Davis, the 1946 Heisman Trophy winner, who prepped at Bonita High School in La Verne, California and Cal Poly Pomona in Pomona, California. Davis led the Bonita Bearcats to a 39-6 win over Newport Harbor in the 1942 CIF Southern Section final by scoring five touchdowns.

1989 winner Kevin Copeland died of heart failure during a game on October 6, 1989, and won the Award posthumously.

Past winners

References

External links
Glenn Davis Award winners Los Angeles Times, December 28, 2014 (accessed April 24. 2015)

High school football trophies and awards in the United States
High school sports in California
American football in Los Angeles
Los Angeles Times
Awards established in 1987
Awards by newspapers
1987 establishments in the United States